Ioannis Sachpatzidis (alternate spellings: Giannis, Yannis) (Greek: Γιάννης Σαχπατζίδης; born September 29, 1993 in Thessaloniki, Greece) is a Greek professional basketball player who last played for Charilaos Trikoupis of the Greek A2 Basket League. He is a 2.09 m (6 ft 10  in) tall power forward-center.

Professional career
Sachpatzidis played minor league level basketball with X.A.N. Thessaloniki, until he joined the Rethymno Cretan Kings of the Greek top-tier level Greek Basket League. The same year, he was loaned to Irakleio of the Greek B League (Greek 3rd Division), where he averaged almost 10 points per game.

The following season, he joined Pagrati of the Greek A2 League (Greek 2nd Division), where he was coached by Dinos Kalampakos. On August 18, 2016, he joined Koroivos Amaliadas of the Greek Basket League, where he eventually became the team captain. The following season, he renewed his contract until 2018.

In 2018, he joined the Greek A2 League club Ionikos Nikaias.

On July 18, 2020, Sachpatzidis joined Charilaos Trikoupis of the Greek A2 League. With Trikoupis, he gained the promotion to the Greek Basket League, while leading the division in blocks. He renewed his contract with the club until 2021.

On July 15, 2021, Sachpatzidis moved to Larisa. On January 9, 2022, he parted ways with Larisa and officially returned to Charilaos Trikoupis. In 8 games, he averaged only 1.6 points and 1.5 rebounds, playing around 7 minutes per contest.

References

External links
Sfera Sports Association Profile
Eurobasket.com Profile

1993 births
Living people
Centers (basketball)
Charilaos Trikoupis B.C. players
Greek Basket League players
Greek men's basketball players
Ionikos Nikaias B.C. players
Irakleio B.C. players
Koroivos B.C. players
Larisa B.C. players
Pagrati B.C. players
Power forwards (basketball)
Rethymno B.C. players
Basketball players from Thessaloniki